Singing the Traditional Songs of Her Kentucky Mountain Family is the first studio album of American folk singer Jean Ritchie. It was released in 1952 by Elektra Records. The album consists of renditions of traditional Appalachian folk songs, some of which are performed a cappella.

Track listing
 O Love is Teasin'
 Jubilee
 Black is The Color
 A Short Life of Trouble
 One Morning in May
 One Morning in May (Version 2)
 Old Virginny
 Skin and Bones
 The Little Devils
 My Boy Willie
 Hush Little Baby
 Gypsum Davy
 The Cuckoo
 The Cuckoo (Version 2)
 Little Cory
 Keep Your Garden Clean

Background
Elektra Records producer Mitch Miller first became aware of Ritchie through her performances in Greenwich Village in the late 1940s and early 50s. Shortly before she signed with Elektra, Ritchie made recordings for Alan Lomax.

The album cover was designed by George Pickow, Ritchie's husband.

References

External links
Jean Ritchie - her early recordings; Mudcat Café

1952 debut albums
Jean Ritchie albums
Elektra Records albums